String of Pearls: A Greatest Hits Collection is the first greatest hits album by Canadian country music group Prairie Oyster. It was released by ViK. Recordings on June 20, 2000. The album peaked at number 15 on the RPM Country Albums chart.

Track listing
"Man in the Moon" (Jenny Whiteley) – 4:09
duet with Jenny Whiteley
"Goodbye, So Long, Hello" (Willie P. Bennett, Russell deCarle) – 3:08
"Will I Do (Till the Real Thing Comes Along)" (Joan Besen) – 2:44
"One Precious Love" (Besen) – 2:10
"Everybody Knows" (Keith Glass, Paul Kennerley) – 2:47
"Did You Fall in Love with Me" (Besen) – 3:36
"Louisiette" (Glass) – 3:20
"Such a Lonely One" (deCarle) – 3:29
"Black-Eyed Susan" (Besen, Ron Hynes) – 3:30
"She Won't Be Lonely Long" (Glass) – 3:32
"Unbelievable Love" (Besen) – 3:34
"One Way Track" (Bennett, deCarle) – 5:41
"Canadian Sunrise" (Besen) – 3:51
"The Last Time I'll Feel Blue" (Glass) – 3:11

Chart performance

References

2000 greatest hits albums
Prairie Oyster albums